Jan de Groot may refer to:

 Jan de Groot (painter) (1650–1726), Dutch painter
 Jan Jakob Maria de Groot (1854–1921), Dutch sinologist and historian of religion

See also
 Johannes de Groot (1914–1972), Dutch mathematician
 John o' Groats, a village in Scotland